Ben Holland (born 10 May 1977) is a former Australian rules footballer who played in the Australian Football League.

References

External links

Demon Wiki profile

1977 births
Living people
Melbourne Football Club players
Richmond Football Club players
Sandringham Football Club players
North Adelaide Football Club players
Australian rules footballers from South Australia